Cryptantha virginensis is a species of wildflower in the borage family known by the common name Virgin River cryptantha. This is a small plant native to the southwestern United States (Arizona, California, Nevada and Utah) where it is a common plant in scrub and woodland. It is named for the Virgin River, a tributary of the Colorado River which runs through the region. This cryptantha is an annual or occasionally a perennial up to 40 centimeters in height. It is coated densely in long white hairs and bristles. The inflorescence is cylindrical or club-shaped, packed with tubular flowers with flat-faced corollas. The flower is usually bright white with yellow throat parts at the tube opening. The fruit is a rough, ridged nutlet.

References

External links

Jepson Manual Treatment
Photo gallery

virginensis
Plants described in 1910
Flora of Arizona
Flora of California
Flora of Nevada
Flora of Utah
Flora without expected TNC conservation status